is a Japanese manga series by Pochi Iida, based on the adult dōjin of the same title. It began serialization in ASCII Media Works's seinen manga magazine Dengeki G's Comic in 2016, before it was moved online to the ComicWalker and Niconico Seiga websites in 2019 after Dengeki G's Comic ceased publication. It has been collected in six tankōbon volumes. The manga is licensed in North America by Yen Press. An original video animation (OVA) adaptation has been announced.

Media

Manga
The series began serialization in the May 2016 issue of ASCII Media Works's Dengeki G's Comic on March 30, 2016. It was then moved online to the ComicWalker and Niconico Seiga websites in April 2019 after Dengeki G's Comic ceased publication after its May 2019 issue. The manga is licensed in North America by Yen Press. As of March 26, 2022, six tankōbon volumes have been released.

Original video animation
An original video animation (OVA) adaptation was announced on January 6, 2020.

Reception
In 2017, The Elder Sister-like One placed sixth in the 3rd Next Manga Award in the printed comics category.

As part of Anime News Network's Spring 2018 manga guide, Rebecca Silverman, Amy McNulty, and Lynzee Loveridge reviewed the first volume. Silverman and Loveridge praised the plot and characters, while all three critics criticized it for being generic at times.

See also
 Do You Love Your Mom and Her Two-Hit Multi-Target Attacks?, a light novel series also illustrated by Pochi Iida

References

External links
 Manga official website 
 

ASCII Media Works manga
Dengeki Comics
Japanese webcomics
Kadokawa Dwango franchises
OVAs based on manga
Romance anime and manga
Seinen manga
Webcomics in print
Yen Press titles